Grewia villosa is a shrub, often scrambling and hardly exceeding 4 m in height. Leaves are fairly large, serrated and heart-shaped. It grows naturally, mainly in dry habitats. It is common in most of the semi-arid parts of Eastern Africa but may now be rare in parts of its natural distribution. It can be seen in Ein Gedi oasis in Israel, and in South Africa, where it is common. Its ripe copper-coloured fruits are eaten in East Africa.

Uses
The fruit of the Grewia villosa were eaten both while immature and green and also once they had ripened and hardened to a dark, reddish-brown.  The bark was stripped off and crushed in water or chewed to a pulp which was used to wash the body as well as to clean the hair and disinfect the scalp

See also
 List of Southern African indigenous trees

References

Maundu, P. M. ; Ngugi, G. W. ; Kabuye, C. H. S., 1999. Traditional food plants of Kenya. Kenya Resource Centre for Indigenous Knowledge, National Museums of Kenya, 270 pages

External links

 
 Grewia villosa, The Jerusalem botanic gardens
 Grewia villosa, Israel wild flowers

villosa
Fruits originating in Africa
Flora of the Indian subcontinent
Flora of Oman
Trees of Western Asia
Plants described in 1803